This is a partial list of vaudeville performers. Inclusion on this list indicates that the subject appeared at least once on the North American vaudeville stage during its heyday between 1881 and 1932. The source in the citation included with each entry confirms their appearance and cites information in the performance notes section.

Vaudeville was a style of variety entertainment predominant in the late 19th and early 20th centuries. Developing from many sources, including saloon shows, minstrel shows, freak shows, dime museums, British pantomimes, and other popular forms of entertainment, vaudeville became one of the most popular types of entertainment in America, Canada, Australia and New Zealand. Vaudeville took the form of a series of separate, unrelated acts each featuring a different types of performance, including classical and popular musical acts, dance performances, comedy, animal acts, magic and illusions, female and male impersonators, acrobatic and athletic feats, one-act plays or scenes from plays, lectures, minstrels, or even short films. A vaudeville performer is sometimes known as a "vaudevillian".

L

M

N–O

P–Q

R

S

T–V

W–Z

Notes

Sources

 2
Vaudville 2